The  is a professional wrestling world junior heavyweight championship owned by the New Japan Pro-Wrestling (NJPW) promotion. Only wrestlers under the junior heavyweight weight-limit may hold the championship. NJPW currently controls two junior heavyweight championships: the IWGP Junior Heavyweight Championship and the IWGP Junior Heavyweight Tag Team Championship.

History 
The title was introduced on February 6, 1986, at a NJPW show.

From August 5, 1996, until November 5, 1997, the title was part of the J-Crown, or J-Crown Octuple Unified Championship. The J-Crown was an assembly of eight different championships from several different promotions. It was created on August 5, 1996, when The Great Sasuke won an eight-man tournament. The IWGP Junior Heavyweight Championship, the British Commonwealth Junior Heavyweight Championship, the NWA World Junior Heavyweight Championship, the NWA World Welterweight Championship, the UWA World Junior Light Heavyweight Championship, the WAR International Junior Heavyweight Championship, the WWA World Junior Light Heavyweight Championship, and the WWF Light Heavyweight Championship were the eight championships that were involved. On November 5, 1997, then-champion Shinjiro Otani vacated all J-Crown belts but the IWGP Junior Heavyweight Championship after the World Wrestling Federation (WWF) retook control of its Light Heavyweight title, effectively ending the J-Crown.

Reigns 

There have been 93 reigns shared among 41 wrestlers with eight vacancies. Title changes happen mostly at NJPW-promoted events, as it has only changed hands at non-NJPW events twice. Reigns 36 and 37 occurred on World Championship Wrestling's Nitro television program, when Juventud Guerrera defeated Jushin Thunder Liger on November 29, 1999, and on December 6, 1999, when Liger retrieved the championship by defeating Guerrera's stand-in Psychosis. Shiro Koshinaka was the first champion in the title's history. Liger holds the record for most reigns with eleven, over which he has successfully defended the title 31 times, more than any champion. He also holds the record for the longest reign in the title's history at 628 days during his sixth reign. Guerrera's only reign of 7 days is the shortest in the title's history.

Hiromu Takahashi is the current champion in his fifth reign. He defeated previous champion Taiji Ishimori, El Desperado and Master Wato in a four-way match on January 4, 2023 at Wrestle Kingdom 17 in Tokyo, Japan.

Combined reigns

References
General

Specific

External links
njpw.co.jp

New Japan Pro-Wrestling championships
Junior heavyweight wrestling championships
1986 establishments in Japan